The Strangers' Banquet is a 1922 American silent drama film directed by Marshall Neilan and starring Hobart Bosworth, Claire Windsor, and Rockliffe Fellowes. It is based on the 1919 novel of the same title by Brian Oswald Donn-Byrne.

Cast

 Hobart Bosworth as 	Shane Keogh
 Claire Windsor as 	Derith
 Rockliffe Fellowes as 	Angus Campbell
 Ford Sterling as Al Norton
 Eleanor Boardman as 	Jean McPherson
 Thomas Holding as 	John Trevelyan
 Eugenie Besserer as 	Mrs. McPherson
 Nigel Barrie as John Keogh
 Stuart Holmes as 	Prince
 Claude Gillingwater as Uncle Sam
 Margaret Loomis as 	Bride
 Tom Guise as 	Bride's Father
 Lillian Langdon as Bride's Mother
 William Humphrey as 	Groom's Friend
 Edward McWade as 	Harriman
 Lorimer Johnston as Ross
 James A. Marcus as 	Braithwaite
 Edward W. Borman as 	Dolan
 Jack Curtis as McKinstry
 Brinsley Shaw as 	Krischenko
 Arthur Hoyt as 	Morel
 Aileen Pringle as Mrs. Schuyler-Peabody
 Virginia Ruggles as 	Olive Stockton
 Cyril Chadwick as 	Bond
 Philo McCullough as 	Britton
 Jean Hersholt as 	Fiend
 Lucille Ricksen as 	Flapper
 Dagmar Godowsky as 	Senorita
 Hayford Hobbs as Toreador
 Violet Joy as Cabaret Girl

References

Bibliography
 Connelly, Robert B. The Silents: Silent Feature Films, 1910-36, Volume 40, Issue 2. December Press, 1998.
 Munden, Kenneth White. The American Film Institute Catalog of Motion Pictures Produced in the United States, Part 1. University of California Press, 1997.

External links

 

1922 films
1922 drama films
1920s English-language films
American silent feature films
Silent American drama films
American black-and-white films
Films directed by Marshall Neilan
Goldwyn Pictures films
1920s American films
English-language drama films